Wiliam Oswaldo Guzmán Aguilar (born 9 September 1994) is a Mexican footballer who plays as a striker for Alacranes de Durango.

Career

C.D. Guadalajara
Guzmán scored his first goal in his professional debut with the club on 25 October 2013 against Monarcas Morelia.

Loan at Coras
Guzmán was loaned to Coras to gain more experience.

References

External links
 
 

1994 births
Living people
Mexican footballers
Association football forwards
C.D. Guadalajara footballers
Coras de Nayarit F.C. footballers
Club Atlético Zacatepec players
Murciélagos FC footballers
La Piedad footballers
Correcaminos UAT footballers
Liga MX players
Ascenso MX players
Liga Premier de México players
Tercera División de México players
Footballers from Guadalajara, Jalisco